Holy Trinity is a Roman Catholic church located in Honolulu, Hawaii.

Holy Trinity Church is located in the East Honolulu neighborhood of Kuliouou on the island of Oahu, at 5919 Kalanianaole Highway (Route 72), . The church serves the communities of Niu Valley, Kuliouou, and Hawaii Kai. It falls under the jurisdiction of the Diocese of Honolulu and the bishop of Honolulu.

References

Roman Catholic Diocese of Honolulu
Buildings and structures in Honolulu
Roman Catholic churches in Hawaii